Rogue Anthem is an American Christian punk and Christian rock band, and they primarily play punk rock. This band was started, in 2012, with members vocalist, Bill B., lead guitarist, Neill B., guitarist, Carter, bassist and keyboardist, Vulcho, and drummer, Tanner. Their former lead vocalist and rhythm guitarist, Myke Augustat died in 2012. The band's first release, with Thumper Punk Records, What to Believe, a studio album, released in 2012.

Background
Rogue Anthem is a Christian punk and Christian rock band from the United States. The band members are vocalist, Bill B., lead guitarist, Neill B., guitarist, Carter, bassist and keyboardist, Vulcho, and drummer, Tanner.

Music history
The band commenced as a musical entity in 2012, with their first release, What to Believe, a studio album, that was released on November 14, 2012 by Thumper Punk Records.

Members
Current members
 Bill B. -  vocals, 
 Neill B. – lead guitar
 Carter – guitar
 Vulcho – bass, keys
 Tanner – drums

Discography
Studio albums
 What to Believe (November 14, 2012, Thumper Punk)

References

External links
Official website

Musical groups established in 2012
2012 establishments in the United States